The 2014–15 Duke Blue Devils women's basketball team will represent Duke University during the 2014–15 NCAA Division I women's basketball season. Returning as head coach was Joanne P. McCallie entering her 8th season. The team plays its home games at Cameron Indoor Stadium in Durham, North Carolina as members of the Atlantic Coast Conference. They finished the season 23–11, 11–5 in ACC play to finish in a tie for fourth place. They advanced to the semifinals of the ACC women's tournament where they lost to Notre Dame. They received at-large bid of the NCAA women's tournament where they defeated Albany in the first round, Mississippi State in the second round before losing to Maryland in the sweet sixteen.

Off season

Departures
2- Alexis Jones, a sophomore with the 2013-14 team that transferred after suffering a knee injury.
3- Kianna Holland, a freshman with the 2013-14 team that transferred.
4- Chloe Wells, a senior with the 2013-14 team that graduated.
5- Katie Heckman, a Redshirt Freshman with the 2013-14 team who received a medical hardship after suffering a torn ACL and two arthroscopic knee surgeries.
12- Chelsea Gray, a senior with the 2013-14 team that graduated.
15- Richa Jackson, a senior with the 2013-14 team that graduated.
32- Tricia Liston, a senior with the 2013-14 team that graduated. She was selected in the 2014 WNBA draft with the 12th pick by the Minnesota Lynx.
33- Haley Peters, a senior with the 2013-14 team that graduated. Signed a WNBA contract with the Washington Mystics but was later waived.

Incoming signees
4- Sierra Calhoun, rated the #7 Point Guard in her class, led Sierra Calhoun of Christ the King to one state championship and 3 straight playoff appearances.
11- Azurá Stevens, former High School McDonald's All-American who averaged 30 points and 20 rebounds per game her senior season.
32- Erin Mathias, WPIL 4A Player of the Year in 2012-13 and a two-time member of the 4A All-State Team in Pittsburgh.
34- Lyneé Belton, former Full Court Fab 50 All-Star in 2013 w/ The Bullis School.

2013–14 media
All Blue Devils games will air on the Blue Devil IMG Sports Network. WDNC will once again act as the main station for the Blue Devils IMG Sports Network games with Steve Barnes providing the play-by-play and Morgan Patrick acting as analyst.

Roster

Schedule

|-
!colspan=12 style="background:#001A57; color:#FFFFFF;"| Exhibition

|-
!colspan=12 style="background:#001A57; color:#FFFFFF;"| Non-conference regular season

|-
!colspan=12 style="background:#001A57; color:#FFFFFF;"| ACC Regular Season

|-
!colspan=12 style="background:#001A57;"| ACC Tournament

|-
!colspan=12 style="background:#001A57; color:#FFFFFF;"| NCAA tournament

Source

Rankings
2014–15 NCAA Division I women's basketball rankings

References

Duke
Duke Blue Devils women's basketball seasons
Duke